The Angered Parish is a parish in the diocese of Gothenburg, Gothenburg Municipality, Västergötland. Angered have 20 633 inhabitants (2011).

In Angered there are only about 20 antiquities: some Stone Age settlements and scattered Iron Age tombs, most now removed.

The stone church without a tower, probably from the 13th century, was adding a choir and porch to the west in 1791.  The wooden barrel vault and the interior has painting decoration from the late 18th century. The sacristy was built in 1929.

Geography of Västra Götaland County
Parishes of the Church of Sweden